The E. Stewart and Mari Williams House is a historic building located in Palm Springs, California. The house is a fine example of the residences that master architect E. Stewart Williams designed between 1947 and the end of the 1960s. The single-story structure features an open floor plan, a low-slung roof, deep overhangs, and large glass surface areas with sliding glass doors that facilitate its indoor-outdoor flow. He also integrated natural materials and the desert into the house's design with rock planters and boulders that penetrate the glass walls in the living room and merge with a fire pit next to the seating area. Williams built this house for his family's residence, but the swimming pool was added by a later owner. The house was listed on the National Register of Historic Places in 2016.

References

Houses completed in 1955
Buildings and structures in Palm Springs, California
National Register of Historic Places in Riverside County, California
Houses on the National Register of Historic Places in California
Modernist architecture in California
E. Stewart Williams buildings
1955 establishments in California